Avtovo is a station on the Kirovsko-Vyborgskaya Line of the Saint Petersburg Metro. Designed by architect , it opened as part of the first Leningrad Metro line on November 15, 1955. In 2014, The Guardian included it on the list of 12 most beautiful metro stations in the world.

Avtovo's unique and highly ornate design features columns faced with ornamental glass manufactured at the Lomonosov factory. Although the original plan envisaged using glass on all of the columns in the station, white marble was substituted on some due to time constraints. This marble was supposed to be temporary, but it has never been replaced. The walls are faced with white marble and adorned on the north side by a row of ornamental ventilation grilles. At the end of the platform a mosaic by V.A. Voronetskiy and A.K. Sokolov commemorates the Leningrad Blockade (1941-1944) during the Second World War.

Unlike the other stations on the first line, Avtovo is a shallow-level station, constructed using the cut and cover method.  It belongs to the shallow column class of underground stations.

Gallery

References

External links
  Description of the station on Metrowalks.ru
 Description of the station on Kommet.spb.ru

Saint Petersburg Metro stations
Railway stations in Russia opened in 1955
Railway stations located underground in Russia
Cultural heritage monuments of regional significance in Saint Petersburg